High school hockey in Missouri consists of two leagues centered in the two largest cities in the state, St. Louis, Missouri and Kansas City, Missouri. The majority of the schools are located in the St. Louis metro area, those teams are members of the Mid-States Club Hockey Association (MSCHA), the larger of the two leagues in Missouri. Schools in the northwest, southwest, central and western portions of Missouri are members of the Mid America High School Hockey League (MAHSHL). High school ice hockey in Missouri is not sanctioned by the Missouri State High School Activities Association (MSHSAA) but is sanctioned by USA Hockey.

NHL Alumni 
 Ben Bishop (Chaminade)
 Chris Butler (Chaminade)
 Neil Komadoski (Chaminade)
 Yan Stastny (Chaminade)
 Paul Stastny (Chaminade)
 Chris Wideman (Chaminade)
 Matthew Tkachuk (Chaminade)
 Brady Tkachuk (Chaminade)
 Mike McKenna (Parkway South)
 Cal Heeter (Christian Brothers College High School)
 Phil McRae (Christian Brothers College High School)
 Joe Vitale (Christian Brothers College High School)
 Patrick Maroon (Oakville Senior High)
 Brandon Bollig  (Francis Howell North)
 Cam Janssen (Eureka)
 Glenn Patrick (Ladue)
 Luke Kunin (Whitfield School)
 Trent Frederic (DeSmet)
 Joseph Woll (Westminster)

Leagues

Mid-States Club Hockey Association (MSCHA) 
The Mid-States Club Hockey Association (MSCHA) is the main high school hockey league in Missouri (and is often referred to as Mid-States).  The league is made up of teams in the St. Louis, Missouri metro area, all teams are located in Missouri except for one team, Edwardsville High School, located in Illinois. The MSCHA is a non-profit organization dedicated to the development of high school hockey.

History 
Originally known as the Area High School Club Hockey League, the MSCHA was founded in 1971 with significant seed money and sponsorship from Union Electric, as well as support from the St. Louis Blues, including the donation of the Challenge Cup for the league's winner, and free usage of The Arena for the final. At the time, organized youth hockey was experiencing a boom in the St. Louis area, mostly caused by the Blues' arrival and subsequent appearance in three Stanley Cup finals. Eight teams contested that first season, with DeSmet winning the first championship. Of the eight teams that played that first year, only three can claim to have been in every Mid-States season: SLUH, CBC, and DeSmet. The league grew quickly, achieving a high of over 50 teams in its second year (when it also changed its name to the current MSCHA), but it also experienced a high rate of attrition, as clubs were disbanded due to loss of players or the removal of school support. Nevertheless, throughout the '70s the league enjoyed great success. Plans were tabled for expansion to Kansas City and Columbia, but they were dropped following a dispute over travel costs and the loss of Columbia's ice rinks.

During the 1980s, the league went through several periods of change; a JV league was established for younger players, schools from new population centers such as West St. Louis County and St. Charles County joined. The playoff format was also changed after the 1984 season into the current system.

The 1990s saw a shift in the balance of power from North County teams such as the Hazelwood schools to newer West County sides, as well as those in St. Charles. In addition to new schools quickly forming teams (resulting in a brief experiment in tiered competition), several former clubs rejoined, including charter member Whitfield. Police presence at games was increased, alcohol was barred from the bleachers, and the league began to cooperate further with schools and encourage faculty/administrative presence at games to curb problems in student sections.

The new millennium presented MSCHA with a large set of opportunities: the St. Louis hockey scene was booming, with players such as the Stastny brothers Paul and Yan and goaltender Ben Bishop honing their NHL-bound skills on high school teams. The league had signed a television contract with local cable provider Charter Communications (via its CCIN channel), allowing both league and playoff games, including Finals, to be seen in homes around the area. However, a series of ugly incidents cast a shadow on this success, including a Priory skater being concussed from a late hit against Affton, further brawls among fans (most notably at Clayton-Ladue games, where the riot police has been called in several times), and a game where a Fort Zumwalt South player physically assaulted a referee, only to be hit back by the official. Two new post-season competitions were introduced, the Doug Wickenheiser Memorial Cup and Founders Cup, both for teams that finished lower on the league ladder.

League Champions
At the conclusion of the regular season, the teams ranked in the top 12 play a round-robin format playoff leading up to the Challenge Cup championship game. The next 16 ranked teams play a similar round-robin format playoff for the Wickenheiser Memorial Cup. The remaining teams play in a traditional playoff style format for the Founders Cup.

Conferences

Mid America High School Hockey League (MAHSHL)
The league is made up of teams from Arkansas, Oklahoma, northern, western and central Missouri and teams from eastern and southern Kansas and was established for the 2009–2010 season. the MAHSHL replaces the Kansas City Metro Area High School Hockey League (KCMAHSHL) which ceased operations for 2008–09. The MAHSHL differs from the Mid-States Club Hockey Association, in that only one team is affiliated with a specific high school. The remaining teams are aligned with a group of school districts. A student athlete must play for the team aligned with their attending school district.

The league carries two divisions, a Varsity Division and a Junior Varsity Division.

Teams
 Rockhurst Hawklets
 Springfield Spirit
 Topeka/Saint Joseph Griffons/Jr Pilots
 Wichita Jr Thunder (KS)
 Kansas City Fighting Saints
 Kansas City Stars
 Northwest Arkansas Ice Hogs (AR)
 Kansas City Jr. Mavericks
 Mid-Missouri Tigers
 Carriage Club
 Oklahoma City Oil Kings

Former teams
The closure of numerous teams in the Kansas City area over a short period of time was primarily driven by the loss of all sheets of ice in the southern portion of the metropolitan area. The King Louie West Ice Chateau on Metcalf Ave in Overland Park, Kansas closed in 2007. In January 2011, Pepsi Ice Midwest on 135th Street in Overland Park, also closed resulting in the loss of the remaining three sheets of ice in the southern Kansas City area. With the loss of King Louie and Pepsi Ice Midwest, there were no longer conveniently located rinks for many of the high school teams that were once part of the Kansas City Metro Area High School Hockey League.

 Blue Valley Tigers
 Blue Valley North Mustangs 
 Blue Valley Northwest Huskies
 Blue Valley West Jaguars
 Des Moines Jr. Buccaneers (Des Moines, Iowa)
 Jefferson City Capitals
 Jefferson City Eagles
 Lee's Summit Storm
 Oak Park Northmen
 Olathe East Hawks
 Park Hill South Panthers
 Pembroke Hill Raiders
 Shawnee Mission Northwest Cougars
 Shawnee Mission South Raiders
 St. Joseph Griffons
 St. Pius Warriors
 St. Thomas Aquinas Saints
 Topeka
 Tulsa Flames
 Wichita Warriors

League Champions

All Conference Selections

During the 2020-21 season, the MAHSHL Board of Directors convened to hold their inaugural MAHSHL All-Conference selections.  At the Varsity level, each coach nominated players from their representative teams in each position (center, left and right wings, defensemen, and goaltenders) and the other coaches voted on those nominations to fill the 20 selections.  No coach was allowed to vote for their own nominations.

Player selections by year:

References

External links
 http://mahshl.com
 https://www.midstateshockey.us/

High school ice hockey in the United States
H
H